Richard Smith (fl. 1402) was an English politician.

Smith was a Member of Parliament for Devizes, Wiltshire in 1402. It is thought that he was a relative of Robert Smith, also an MP for Devizes, but beyond this, nothing is known of him.

References

Year of birth missing
Year of death missing
14th-century births
15th-century deaths
English MPs 1402
People from Devizes